Yao He was a Chinese poet of the middle Tang dynasty. He was a great-grandson of chancellor Yao Chong. He was often called Yao Wugong, and his poetry style was called "Wugong Style". Yao was very famous at his time. He knew Liu Yuxi, Li Shen, Zhang Ji, Wang Jian, Yang Juyuan, Ma Dai, Li Qunyu well, and was a close friend of Jia Dao. His style was very similar to Jia Dao, but was more tame and superficial.

References

External links 
Books of the Quan Tangshi that include collected poems of Yao He at the Chinese Text Project:
Book 496, Book 497, Book 498, Book 499, Book 500, Book 501, Book 502

Tang dynasty poets
9th-century Chinese poets
Writers from Sanmenxia
Poets from Henan